Marcello Macchia (born 2 August 1978) is an Italian comedian, actor, writer and filmmaker. Best known by his stage name Maccio Capatonda, he is also known for his participation in television programs such as Mai dire... on Italia 1.

With Enrico Venti, Capatonda leads Shortcut Productions, the company that produces their own videos. Since 2011, he is a member of the crew of Lo Zoo di 105. In 2015, he played part in his first film, Italiano medio. In 2020, Capatonda's first book, Libro (literal translate: Book), was released.

Style
Capatonda's comedy is based primarily on parodying common mistakes of Italian speakers, and also in using long words out of their intended context; he makes his characters speak as clumsy illiterates that accidentally create new words along the way, trying to express themselves. Another part of his production ridicules commercials, reality shows, TV snake oil sellers and fortune tellers, soap operas, and film trailers. Sketches are peppered with onomatopoeia and strong emphasis in pronunciation. Another regular feature are the extremely unlikely names of the portrayed characters, frequently based on puns.

Filmography
 Italiano medio (2015)
 Quel bravo ragazzo (2016)
 Omicidio all'italiana (2017)
 Robbing Mussolini (2022)

TV and web series
 Intralci (2006)
 La Villa di Lato (2009)
 Drammi Medicali (2009)
 Lost in Google (2012)
 Mario (2013–2014)
 Bob Torrent (2015)

Podcasts 

 Podcast Micidiali (Audible, 2021)

Bibliography

Personal life
In 2013, Capatonda was involved in a romantic relationship with Italian actress Elisabetta Canalis.

References

External links
Official YouTube channel

Italian male actors
Italian male voice actors
1978 births
Living people
Italian comedians
People of Abruzzese descent